Datieguan is a station on Line 1 and Line 5 of the Hangzhou Metro in China. It was opened in November 2012, together with the rest of the stations on Line 1. The Line 5 began its service on 23 April 2020. It is located in the Xiacheng District of Hangzhou.

References

Railway stations in Zhejiang
Railway stations in China opened in 2012
Hangzhou Metro stations